Rivers West senatorial district is one of the three senatorial districts in Rivers State, Nigeria. It is currently represented by Betty Okagua Apiafi.

District profile
The district covers the local government areas of Abua–Odual, Ahoada East, Ahoada West, Akuku-Toru, Asari-Toru, Bonny, Degema and Ogba–Egbema–Ndoni. In 2014, it had a projected population of 2,366,158.

Election results

2015

List of senators
Ibiapuye Martyns-Yellowe (1999 – 2007)
Wilson Ake (2007 – 2015)
Osinakachukwu Ideozu (2015 – 2017)
Andrew Uchendu (2017-2019)
Betty Okagua - Apiafi (2019 -

References

Rivers State senatorial districts